List of Colonial Heads of Malawi (Nyasaland)

(Dates in italics indicate de facto continuation of office)

{|class="wikitable"
Term
Incumbent
Notes
|-
|colspan=3|Nyasaland Districts Protectorate
|-
|1 February 1891 to 1893||Harry Hamilton Johnston, Commissioner||
|-
|colspan=3|British Central Africa Protectorate
|-
|1893 to 16 April 1896||Harry Hamilton Johnston, Commissioner||
|-
|16 April 1896 to 1 April 1907||Alfred Sharpe, Commissioner|| from 1 January 1902 he was Commissioner, Commander-in-Chief and Consul-General
|-
|colspan=3|Nyasaland
|-
|1 April 1907 to September 1907||Francis Barrow Pearce, acting Commissioner||
|-
|October 1907 to 1 May 1908||William Henry Manning, acting Governor||1st Term 
|-
|1 May 1908 to 1 April 1910||Alfred Sharpe, Governor||
|-
|1 April 1910 to 4 July 1910||Francis Barrow Pearce, acting Governor||
|-
|4 July 1910 to 6 February 1911||Henry Richard Wallis, acting Governor||
|-
|6 February 1911 to 23 September 1913||William Henry Manning, acting Governor||2nd Term 
|-
|23 September 1913 to 12 April 1923||George Smith, Governor||Knighted during tenure
|-
|12 April 1923 to 27 March 1924||Richard Sims Donkin Rankine, acting Governor||
|-
|27 March 1924 to 30 May 1929||Charles Calvert Bowring, Governor||
|-
|30 May 1929 to 7 November 1929||Wilfred Bennett Davidson-Houston, acting Governor||
|-
|7 November 1929 to 22 November 1932||Shenton Thomas, Governor ||Knighted during tenure
|-
|22 November 1932 to 9 April 1934||Hubert Winthrop Young, Governor||
|-
|9 April 1934 to 21 September 1934||Kenneth Lambert Hall, acting Governor||
|-
|21 September 1934 to 20 March 1939||Harold Baxter Kittermaster, Governor||
|-
|20 March 1939 to 8 August 1942||Donald Mackenzie-Kennedy, Governor||
|-
|8 August 1942 to 27 March 1947||Edmund Charles Smith Richards, Governor||
|-
|30 March 1947 to 10 April 1956||Geoffrey Francis Taylor Colby, Governor||Knighted during tenure
|-
|1 August 1953 to 31 December 1963||colspan=2|Incorporated into the Federation of Rhodesia and Nyasaland
|-
|10 April 1956 to 10 April 1961||Robert Perceval Armitage, Governor||
|-
|10 April 1961 to 6 July 1964||Glyn Smallwood Jones, Governor||
|-
|6 July 1964||colspan=2|Independence as Malawi
|}

For continuation after independence, see: List of heads of state of Malawi

References

See also
History of Malawi
Governor-General of the Federation of Rhodesia and Nyasaland

History of Malawi
Malawi history-related lists